Arthur Holmes (1890–1965) was a British geologist.

Arthur Holmes may also refer to:

 Arthur F. Holmes (1924–2011), philosopher
 Arthur W. Holmes (1865–1944), architect
 Arthur Holmes Jr. (born 1931), United States Army general

See also
 Arthur Holmes Howell (1872–1940), zoologist